Falerii Novi (English: New Falerii) was a walled town in the Tiber River valley, about  north of Rome and  west of Civita Castellana.

History

According to Polybius and Livy, the Falisci people of Falerii Veteres revolted against the Roman Republic in 241 B.C. Titus Manlius Torquatus was sent and during the first battle the Falerii defeated the Romans, but their cavalry was defeated. In the second battle the Romans defeated the Falerii. The slaves of the Falisci and half of their territory were seized, and Falerii Veteres was destroyed. The war lasted six days, with the siege of Falerii Veteres taking three days.

The Falisci were resettled in a new town in a less defensible position. It was built on the left bank of Rio Purgatorio on a slight volcanic plateau five kilometers west of Falerii Veteres. The walls of the city, made from tufa blocks, had fifty towers and nine gates. The town remained inhabited until around 700 A.D.

Excavations

In 1829, the theater was excavated and was discovered to have statues from the reign of Augustus depicting members of his family , with his wife Livia, and grandsons Gaius Caesar and Lucius Caesar. In 1903, the city plan of Falerii Novi was examined.

In 2020, a ground-penetrating radar survey conducted by Cambridge and Ghent universities showed a network of water pipes that notably run under the blocks and not, as is more usual, along the streets.  The survey also mapped a market, temple, bath complex and a public monument buried underneath the town. From 2021, a new major excavation project begun across the site, which has so far revealed a market building, house, and streetside infrastructure from the mid-Republic to Late Antiquity.

Notable structures

The foundations of this temple were discovered by ground penetrating radar placing it several feet underneath the current excavations.

An 11th Century Benedictine Abbey Church incorporating stone taken from the Roman structures is located near the west gate at Falerii Novi.

References

Roman towns and cities in Italy